Johann Philipp Gerlach (24 July 1679 – 17 September 1748) was a Prussian court architect, who built churches and public buildings in and around Berlin.

Career 
Gerlach was born in Spandau. In 1707, he succeeded Martin Grünberg as royal director of building (königlicher Baudirektor und Leiter des Bauwesens) in Berlin. King Frederick William I of Prussia promoted him to Oberbaudirektor der königlichen Residenzen in 1720, making him responsible for all building of the state including bridges and fortifications. Gerlach directed the remodelling of the Kronprinzenpalais in 1733, and built the Kollegienhaus/Kammergericht in 1734/35.

He also designed three mayor squares in Friedrichstadt: Pariser Platz (Quarree), Leipziger Platz (Oktogon) and Mehringplatz (Rondell). The Garnisonkirche in Potsdam was his major work as an architect. Its ruin was demolished in 1963.

He died in Berlin.

Works 

 1721–1722 , changed in 1816 by Rabe, and in 1863 by Stüler, not extant
 1721–1724 St. Nikolai in Potsdam, burnt in 1795
 1724 Town hall and Hauptwache in Prenzlau, not extant
 1725–1731 Jerusalemer Kirche, changed by E. Knoblauch, not extant 

 1731–1735 Garnisonkirche in Potsdam, not extant, restoration planned

 1735 Brandenburger Tor, replaced in 1788 for the new gate by Carl Gotthard Langhans

 1736 , demolished in 1872

References

External links 

 
 Gerlach, Philipp life and works, Verein für die Geschichte Berlins
 Johann Philipp Gerlach luise-berlin.de
 

German Baroque architects
Architects from Berlin
1679 births
1748 deaths